The Northwestern were an English indie rock band, formed by former Hope of the States members Sam Herlihy and Simon Jones

Their first full tour commenced on 29 May 2009, playing eleven shows across the UK. Their debut single "Telephones" / "All The Ones", was released through Friends Vs. Records on 15 June 2009.

In November 2009, The Northwestern released their second vinyl, the Ghostrock EP (containing four tracks and released on 10" vinyl), to coincide with their final tour of the UK in 2009, visiting various venues around the UK.

The band split in 2012 and released a collection of demos posthumously via Bandcamp.

Members
The band consists of:
Sam Herlihy: Guitar/Vocals
Simon Jones: Drums
Francesco Menegat: Bass
Jonny Winter: Guitar
Ian McCullagh: Guitar

Discography
 "Telephones"/"All The Ones" (7" Single limited to 500 copies) 15 June 2009
 Ghostrock EP (10" single sold on tour and through a couple of internet sites - released November 2009)

References

English indie rock groups